The 2004–05 Сzech 1.liga season was the 12th season of the Czech 1.liga, the second level of ice hockey in the Czech Republic. Fourteen teams participated in the league, and HC Ceske Budejovice won the championship.

Regular season

Playoffs

Quarterfinals
 HC České Budějovice – HC Sareza Ostrava 3:0 (6:0, 4:0, 3:2)
 HC Slovan Ústí nad Labem – HC Kometa Brno 3:0 (3:1, 6:2, 4:2)
 HC Hradec Králové – KLH Chomutov 2:3 (4:2, 3:2 P, 3:4 P, 1:4, 3:5)
 BK Mladá Boleslav – HC Beroun 3:0 (3:2, 2:0, 4:2)

Semifinals 
 HC České Budějovice – KLH Chomutov 3:2 (2:1 SN, 2:3, 2:3 P, 3:2 P, 3:2 P)
 HC Slovan Ústí nad Labem – BK Mladá Boleslav 3:1 (3:2, 5:1, 1:2, 5:2)

Finals 
 HC České Budějovice – HC Slovan Ústí nad Labem 3:0 (2:1, 3:0, 3:0)

Relegation

External links
 Season on hockeyarchives.info

2004–05 in Czech ice hockey
Czech
Czech 1. Liga seasons